The following is a timeline of the history of the municipality of Utrecht, Netherlands.

Prior to 18th century

 
 ~50 AD - Roman fortress built on what is now the Dom square as part of the Limes Germanicus. Named Traiectum to signify it was at a crossing of what was at that time the main branch of the Rhine (now the Oude Gracht)
 ~200 AD - Wooden fortress walls upgraded to imported tuff stone. Parts of these wall survive to date
 ~270 AD - Limes Germanicus including the fortress at Trajectum abandoned due to continued invasions.
 636 - Chapel built by Dagobert I within the walls of the abandoned Roman fortress.
 695 - Catholic diocese of Utrecht established.
 720 - St. Martin's church founded by Willibrord (approximate date).
 918 - Balderic becomes bishop.
 1122
 22 June: Town privileges confirmed by Henry V, Holy Roman Emperor.
 Oudegracht (canal) construction begins.
 1145 -  (tower) built (approximate date).
 1267 - St. Martin's Cathedral built.
 1279 - Buurkerk (church) rebuilding begins.
 1370 - Public clock installed (approximate date).
 1382 - St. Martin's Cathedral tower built.
 1393 -  (moat) constructed.
 1432 -  built.
 1440
 Guildhall St. Eloy's Hospice in use.
 Illuminated manuscript Hours of Catherine of Cleves created in Utrecht (approximate date).
 1455 - 7 April: Gijsbrecht van Brederode becomes bishop elect of Utrecht after being elected by the chapters.
 1455 - 13 September: David of Burgundy becomes bishop of Utrecht by papal appointment.
 1459 - 2 March: Adriaan Florensz, the later Pope Adrian VI born.
 1470-4 - First Utrecht Civil War to quell continued opposition to his rule David of Burgundy imprisons Gijsbrecht van Brederode leading to the first Utrecht civil war.
 1471 - Printing press in operation (approximate date).
 1481-3 - Second Utrecht Civil War, David of Burgundy temporarily removed from power, but restored after the Siege of Utrecht (1483)
 1517 -  (residence) built.
 1528 - Lordship of Utrecht established.
 1532 - Vredenburg (castle) built.
 1550 - St. Catherine Cathedral built (approximate date).
 1577 - Demolition of Vredenburg castle begins.
 1579 - 23 January: Treaty unifying northern provinces of the Netherlands signed in Utrecht.
 1584 - Catholic property secularized.
 1586 - Calvinists in power.
 1620s - Utrecht Caravaggisti artists active.
 1636 - Utrecht University and its library established.
 1637 -  built.
 1644 - Schilders-Collegie founded.
 1672-3 - Occupation by French forces.
 1674 - 1 August: . Major damage to several landmark building, most notably the collapse of the nave of the Dom church.

18th-19th centuries
 1713 - International peace treaty relating to the War of the Spanish Succession signed in Utrecht.
 1773 -  founded.
 1787 - 9 May: Prussians in power.
 1795 - 18 January: Utrecht "acquired by the French."
 1807 -  (art society) formed.
 1808 -  established.
 1813 -  becomes mayor.
 1816 -  (student society) founded.
 1823
 Abstede, Catharijne, Lauwerecht, and Tolsteeg become part of city.
  opens.
 1830 -  built.
 1838 - City Museum of Antiquities opens.
 1843 - Utrecht Centraal railway station opens.
 1853 - Sonnenborgh Observatory established.
 1866 - Population: 58,607 in city; 172,487 in province.
 1872 - Aartsbisschoppelijk Museum opens.
 1873 - Museum Kunstliefde established.
 1879 - Regional Utrecht State Archives established.
 1884
  (applied arts museum) opens.
 Population: 74,364.
 1892 - Public library established.
 1893 -  (newspaper) begins publication.
 1894 -  founded.
 1898 -  opens.

20th century

 1902 -  built.
 1906 -  (electric tram) begins operating.
 1908 -  (cinema) opens.
 1913 -  (cinema) opens.
 1914 - Old Catholic St. Gertrude's Cathedral built.
 1916 - Nationale Bankvereeniging (bank) established.
 1919 - Population: 138,334.
 1921 - Centraal Museum established.
 1924 - Rietveld Schröder House built in the De Stijl design mode.
 1927 -  construction begins (approximate date).
 1940 - Population: 165,029.
 1950 - Population: 193,190.
 1954 - Oudenrijn (section) and Zuilen become part of city.
 1960 - Population: 254,186.
 1961 -  built.
 1968 -  cannabis coffee shop in business.
 1970 - Football Club Utrecht formed.
 1970s - part of moat converted to motorway.
 1976 -  hi-rise built.
 1978 -  cinema opens.
 1979 - Muziekcentrum Vredenburg (concert hall) and Museum Catharijneconvent open.
 1980 - Population: 237,037 municipality.
 1985 - May: Catholic pope visits Utrecht.
 1987 - Leefbaarheidsbudget (participatory budgeting) introduced.
 1998 - City Utrecht Archive established.
 2000 - Population: 233,667.

21st century

 2001 - Vleuten-De Meern becomes part of  city.
 2002 - Regio Randstad regional governance group formed.
 2006 -  museum opens.
 2008 -  hi-rise built.
 2011 - Rabobank Bestuurscentrum hi-rise built.
 2012 - Utrecht befriends the city of Portland, Oregon, USA.
 2013 - Population: 321,916 municipality.
 2014
 TivoliVredenburg concert hall opens.
 Jan van Zanen becomes mayor.
 2015 - July: 2015 Tour de France cycling race starts from Utrecht.
 2017
 May: Basic income pilot to begin.
 August: Bicycle parking garage opens.
 2019 - March: 2019 Utrecht shooting
 2020 - September: re-conversion of motorway back to moat/canal completed.

See also
 Utrecht history
 
 List of mayors of Utrecht
 
 
 
 
 Timelines of other municipalities in the Netherlands: Amsterdam, Breda, Delft, Eindhoven, Groningen, Haarlem, The Hague, 's-Hertogenbosch, Leiden, Maastricht, Nijmegen, Rotterdam

References

This article incorporates information from the Dutch Wikipedia.

Bibliography

Published in the 18th-19th century
in English
 
 
 
 
  (+ 1851 ed.)

in other languages
 
 
  (bibliography)

Published in the 20th century
in English
 
 
  (+ 1876 ed.)
 
 
 (+ 1881 ed.)
 
 

in Dutch

External links

 Europeana. Items related to Utrecht, various dates.
 Digital Public Library of America. Items related to Utrecht, various dates

 
Utrecht
Years in the Netherlands